Guacamaya is an international group of hackers that has published anonymous reports and leaked sensitive files in the public interest through Distributed Denial of Secrets and Enlace Hacktivista. It operates mainly in Central and Latin America and to date has hacked major corporations and the governments of Chile, Colombia, El Salvador, Guatemala, Mexico and Peru.

Motivation 
The group says they're motivated by anti-imperialism and environmentalism, and that they fight against transnational corporations and external intervention in Latin America, singling out extractivism and the armed forces and the defense of natural resources and native communities. 

The group said they wanted to expose companies and governments, "so that everyone knows their way of operating, their actions, their profits and the interest that is clearly to profit no matter the damage they cause." Guacamaya told Motherboard in an email. "These hacks are another form of struggle and resistance, they are the continuation of an ancestral legacy; taking care of life. We hope to cause more people to join, to leak, sabotage, and hack these sources of oppression and injustice, so that the truth be known and that it is the people who decide to end it." They told Cyberscoop that they target "anything that represents oppressive states, multinational corporations and, in short, anything that supports this system of death."

Hacks

Attacks on transnational companies 
In 2022, the group said they were responsible for a series of cyberattacks aimed at large mining companies in Latin America, including the Colombian oil company New Granada Energy Corporation, the Brazilian mining company Tejucana, the Venezuelan oil company Oryx Resources, the Ecuadorian state-owned mining company ENAMI EP, and the Chilean boric acid producer Quiborax.

2022 Guatemalan Nickel Company Hack 
In March 2022, Guacamaya first became known by hacking the mining company Compañía Guatemalteca de Níquel (CGN), a subsidiary of Solway Investment Group. The leaked documents reveal payments to Guatemalan Police who persecuted and detained activists and journalists who opposed the "Fénix" mining project in El Estor, Guatemala.

Operation Fuerzas Represivas 
In mid-2022, the group announced Operation Fuerzas Represivas, a series of cyberattacks aimed at the armed forces of Chile, Colombia, Mexico, Peru, and El Salvador.

Hacking of the Joint Chiefs of Staff of Chile in 2022 
In 2022, the Chilean press reported on the hacking of the Chilean Joint Chiefs of Staff (EMCO), a massive leak of national security data. The leak was made up of emails sent and received between 2012 and May 2022 by EMCO, the agency in charge of intelligence, operations and logistics for national defence purposes. General Guillermo Paiva Hernández, head of the country’s Joint Chiefs of Staff, resigned in response to the leak.

Hacking to the Secretariat of National Defense of Mexico of 2022 
On September 29, 2022, journalist Carlos Loret de Mola announced on his newscast that he had received 6 terabytes of hacked information from the Mexican Ministry of National Defense from Guacamaya. The 4.1 million emails from SEDENA date from 2016 to 2022 and include communications between the Secretary of National Defense and the Secretary of the Navy, data on the health of the President, and contracts for the construction of the Mayan train. This leak is considered the largest in the history of Mexico.

Known as the "SEDENA Leaks" or the "Guacamaya Leaks", they show that the army has surveilled feminists groups and considers them a threat equal to cartels. The leaks document how widespread and difficult to report sexual abuse is within the army. It also shows that the Army used the Pegasus spyware to spy on journalists. The leaks reveal new details of the army's role in the Ayotzinapa case where 42 students were murdered. It also reveals the militaries goals of developing a tourist business, including amusement parks, an airline, museums and hotels.

Hacking of the Joint Command of the Armed Forces of Peru in 2022 
In October 2022, a report in La Encerrona revealed a massive leak of military intelligence data Joint Command of the Armed Forces of Peru (CCFFAA). The report gave special focus to the Southern Operational Command of the Army. The leaks revealed the military was monitoring reporters, left-wing parties and figures, and that they labeled civil organizations as a threat because they "infiltrate and advise the population against mining." The Peruvian military threatened to bring treason charges against a journalist with the independent Peruvian news outlet La Encerrona for reporting on the leak.

See also 

 Anonymous
 WikiLeaks

References 

Hacker groups
Hacking in the 2020s
Hacktivists
Internet leaks
Latin America
News leaks
Transparency (behavior)